The San Cayetano Fault is an east-west trending thrust fault in Ventura County, Southern California.

Geology
The last known surface rupture was less than 5,000 years ago. Recent research indicates that the San Cayetano fault may have been the source of the December 21, 1812 earthquake. 

The recurrence rate between events is uncertain, but if the fault is associated with the 1812 event, it may be able to produce earthquakes approaching 6.5 – 7.3 in magnitude.

References

External links
San Cayetano Fault – Southern California Earthquake Center

Seismic faults of California
Geology of Ventura County, California
Fillmore, California
Ojai, California
Santa Paula, California
Topatopa Mountains
Plate tectonics